Frau Ella is a 2013 German comedy film directed by Markus Goller.

Cast 
 Matthias Schweighöfer as Sascha
 Ruth Maria Kubitschek as Frau Ella
 August Diehl as Klaus
 Anna Bederke as Lina
 Anatole Taubman as Rudolph
  as Arzt Krankenhaus
 Anna Thalbach as Schwester Erika
  as Kalle

References

External links 

2013 comedy films
2013 films
German comedy films
Films scored by Martin Todsharow
2010s German films